Route 158 is a short highway in Butler County, Missouri.  The eastern terminus is at Route 142 and the road runs straight west for 6 miles (10 km).  The western terminus is at the intersection of U.S. Route 67 (Future Interstate 57) and U.S. Route 160 about 10 miles (16 km) southwest of Poplar Bluff.  The town of Harviell is the only town on the highway.

Route description
Route 158 begins at an intersection with US 67/US 160 (Future I-57) in Butler County, where the road continues west as part of US 160. From the western terminus, the route heads east as a two-lane, undivided road, passing through a mix of farms and woods with some homes. Route 158 reaches the community of Harviell, where it passes to the south residences and crosses Union Pacific's Hoxie Subdivision. Past Harviell, the road runs through farmland and intersects Route BB. Farther east, Route 158 comes to its eastern terminus at an intersection with Route 142.

Major intersections

References

158
Transportation in Butler County, Missouri